Mahesh Viswanathan is an engineer at IBM. He was named a Fellow of the Institute of Electrical and Electronics Engineers (IEEE) in 2015 for his contributions to ubiquitous access to cloud computing and to vehicular speech communications.

References

Fellow Members of the IEEE
Living people
Year of birth missing (living people)
Place of birth missing (living people)
IBM employees